Margarita del Mazo (born 17 October 1960) is a Spanish writer of children's literature.

Biography
Margarita del Mazo earned a law degree from the Complutense University of Madrid. In the late 1990s, she began narrating live stories, and in 2009, she published her first book, La máscara del león.

She collaborates with the Instituto Cervantes on several of its festivals (Day E, Festival Ñ and Cervantino Day of Children's and Young Adult Literature), in different national and international venues, with presentations, workshops, author meetings and narration sessions.

She has carried out several presentations at conferences and festivals of literature and illustration (IlustraTour, Hay Festival). In 2010, she participated in the International Congress of Art, Education, and Visual Culture in Early Childhood and Primary Education.

In 2017, she was invited to Chicago and other communities in Illinois, to participate in narration sessions and meetings with authors and teachers in bilingual centers and libraries.

Works

Children's literature

Awards and recognitions
 2010 Junceda Award finalist for Mosquito
 2011  for Hamelín
 Plaque BIB at the 2013 Bratislava Biennale for the illustrations in Hamelín
 2014 Gremio de Libreros de Madrid Award for Best Illustrated Album for El Rebaño
 2015 Plastilina & Bloggers Award for Best Illustrated Album for El Rebaño
 2016 Cuatrogatos Foundation Award for El Rebaño
 2018 Cuatrogatos Foundation Award for 5 PATITOS
 2014 Isaac Díaz Pardo Award Finalist for Feroz, el lobo
 Honorable mention for the illustrations of Feroz, el lobo at the 2014 Sharjah Internacional Book Fair, United Arab Emirates
 2016 Gelett Burgess Children's Book Award in the category Spanish Language Society and Culture for La luz de Lucía

References

External links
  

1960 births
Living people
21st-century Spanish women writers
Complutense University of Madrid alumni
Writers from the Community of Madrid
Spanish children's writers
Spanish women children's writers